Autobiogeography is a self-referential map or other geographic document created by the subject. It is a convergence of autobiography and geography that indicates geolocation of personal experiences such as travel, personal migration or important experiences. The first use of autobiogeography documented online was in the Summer 2002 Reconstruction.org academic peer review journal. The technique was popularized in 2005 by internet trends encouraging social mapping and personal mapping.

An autobiogeography can take many forms, from formal anthropological study to loose, intimate autobiogeographies found on social mapping websites. Unlike autobiographies, broad celebrity is less important than relevance to a small social circle or to oneself. For this reason, an interesting subject for an autobiogeography may be someone relatively unknown.

External links
 Rodinsky's Room As Autobiogeography 
 Reconstruction: Studies In Contemporary Culture First documented online use 
 Speed of Creativity Blog, April 2006 
 NPR, April 2006 
 Lifehacker, April 2006 
 Forbes, June, 2006 
 Autobiogeography as Decolonial Methodology, September, 2017 
 a/b: Auto/Biography Studies, February, 2019 

 
Cartography